In mathematics, Mahler's 3/2 problem concerns the existence of "-numbers".

A -number is a real number  such that the  fractional parts of

Kurt Mahler conjectured in 1968 that there are no -numbers.

More generally, for a real number , define  as

Mahler's conjecture would thus imply that  exceeds .  Flatto, Lagarias, and Pollington showed that

for rational  in lowest terms.

References

 

Analytic number theory
Conjectures
Diophantine approximation